The American Magazine was a periodical publication founded in June 1906, a continuation of failed publications purchased a few years earlier from publishing mogul Miriam Leslie. It succeeded Frank Leslie's Popular Monthly (1876–1904), Leslie's Monthly Magazine (1904–1905), Leslie's Magazine (1905) and the American Illustrated Magazine (1905–1906). The magazine was published through August 1956.

History
Under the magazine's original title, Frank Leslie's Popular Monthly, it had begun to be published in 1876 and was renamed  Leslie's Monthly Magazine in 1904,  and then was renamed again as Leslie's Magazine in 1905. From September 1905, through May 1906, it was entitled the American Illustrated Magazine; then subsequently shortened as The American Magazine until publication ceased in 1956. It kept continuous volume numbering throughout its history.

In June 1906, muckraking journalists Ray Stannard Baker, Lincoln Steffens and Ida M. Tarbell left McClure's to help create The American Magazine. An "Editorial Announcement" published in 1907 lead with Tarbell's coverage of tariff policy. Baker contributed articles using the pseudonym David Grayson. Under John Sanborn Phillips, who served as editor until 1915, the monthly magazine departed somewhat from the muckraking style and focused on human interest stories, social issues and fiction. Initially published by his Phillips Publishing Company of Springfield, Ohio, it later was taken over by Crowell Publishing Company in 1911, and later merged with Collier's. The American Magazine was published by Crowell-Collier until it folded in 1956.

Editors
With the changes in 1915, John M. Siddall (1915–23) was appointed as editor of the periodical, which expanded its market considerably by concentrating on a female readership. The cover of the September 1917 issue announced: "This Magazine's Circulation Has Doubled in 20 Months." The September 1922 cover stated circulation had reached 1.8 million.

Merle Crowell served as editor of The American Magazine from 1923 until 1929 when Sumner Blossom took over. Blossom, who had been editor of Popular Science, was there for the last 27 years of the magazine's existence. Fictional serials and short stories were a popular feature, and the magazine published several winners of the O. Henry Awards. High-profile writers contributed articles on a variety of topics.

During his editorship, Blossom adopted the unusual policy of hiding the author's name on all works of fiction during the selection process as a way to encourage new fiction writers. The magazine's staff learned the author's identity only once they accepted or rejected a manuscript.

The last issue of The American Magazine was displayed on newsstands in August 1956.

Stories
In 1934, The American Magazine ran a story called "Uncle Sam Grows Younger" that praised Alger Hiss:  "In his twenties, he is one of the men chiefly responsible for the plan to buy $650,000,000 worth of commodities to feed the unemployed. He has too much spirit for his bodily strength and is in danger of working himself to death."

Notable contributors

Bess Streeter Aldrich
Sherwood Anderson
Harry J. Anslinger
J. Ogden Armour
Irving Bacheller
John Barrymore
Neith Boyce
Frances Hodgson Burnett
Ellis Parker Butler
Leslie Charteris
Agatha Christie
Lincoln Ross Colcord
Arthur Conan Doyle
Courtney Ryley Cooper
Jane Cowl
Will Durant
Amelia Earhart
Edna Ferber
Lucine Finch 
F. Scott Fitzgerald
Henry Ford
Graham Greene
Zane Grey
Dashiell Hammett
Eric Hatch
Syd Hoff
Kin Hubbard
Clarence Budington Kelland
Harry Kemp
Jack Lait
Munro Leaf
Walter Lippmann
William J. Locke
John A. Moroso
Albert Jay Nock
Kathleen Norris
Vance Packard
William Dudley Pelley
General John J. Pershing
Channing Pollock
Olive Higgins Prouty
Mary Roberts Rinehart
Grantland Rice
Franklin D. Roosevelt
Upton Sinclair
Rex Stout
Booth Tarkington
Frederick Winslow Taylor
S. S. Van Dine
H. G. Wells
Paul R. Williams
Peter Dale Wimbrow
P. G. Wodehouse
Harold Bell Wright

References

External links

 
 The American Magazine archive at Hathitrust
 

Defunct literary magazines published in the United States
Magazines disestablished in 1956
Magazines established in 1906
Progressive Era in the United States
Monthly magazines published in the United States
Magazines published in Ohio
1906 establishments in Ohio